= Helmet of eight plates in the Korean style =

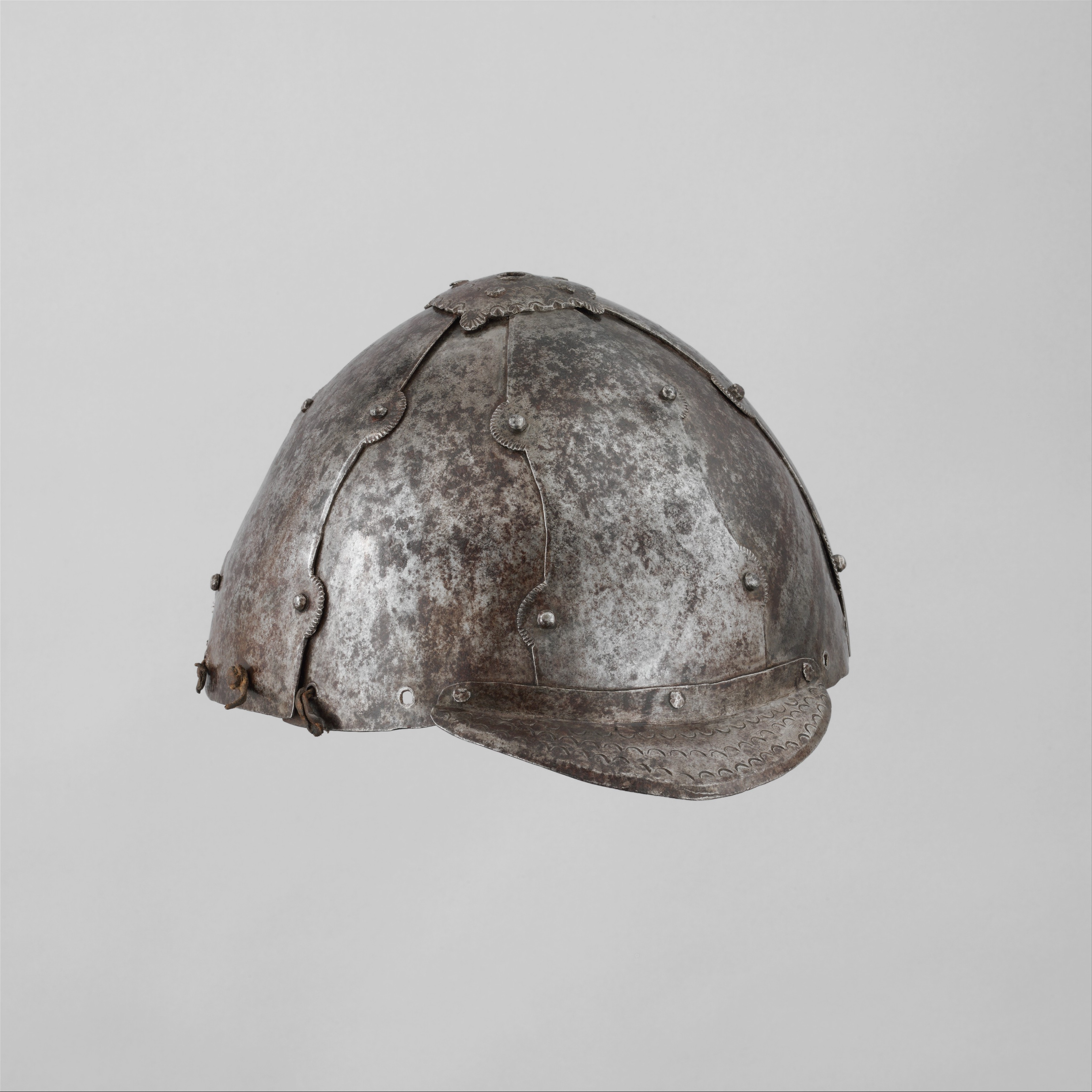
Korean Helmet of eight plates in the Korean style, Metropolitan Museum of Art, New York.

Helmet of eight plates in the Korean style (Chinese: 朝鲜式八板头盔) is a helmet produced between 14th and 16th centuries in either Korean Peninsula or Mongolia. (Note: This eight plated helmets may have come from Mongolian region. But the current theory is that they were originated in North Korean regions.) This helmet consists of eight plates made of iron. It is speculated that this helmet style was spread to Korean Peninsula from the Tibetan regions. Helmets with similar structure can be seen in Tibet, while both versions of the helmet are made of iron and leather. But Korean-style eight plated helmets are distinguished from those of Tibetan style by its relatively smaller size. Usually a Tibetan-style eight plated helmet measures 21–22 cm in height. But this Korean style helmet measures only 13 cm in height. Currently displayed at the Metropolitan Museum of Art, New York, the Korean style helmet measures 24.3 cm in length and 21 cm in width and 1065.9 g in weight.

== Description ==
This kind of helmets called Ba Ban has historically originated in the 8th century AD. It spanned from 8th century to the 16th century AD. Originally it was seen in Tibetan region. The reason why it is called the "Helmet of eight plates", because it consists of eight plates made of iron and leather. Surprisingly, many well-preserved eight plated helmets in the Tibetan style can be observed at several Tibetan monasteries’ The Tibetan style helmets are similar to Korean helmets in structure. But Tibetan ones are quite larger than that of Korean. Usually, a Tibetan style helmet measures 21–22 cm in height and the Korean example at the Metropolitan Museum of Art in New York measures only 13 cm in height. Since, no enough evidence has been found from the research process, it is controversial whether a chin trap with the helmet was used or not. But neither Korean nor Tibetan eight plated helmets were found themselves with a chin strap.
